Ghaath may refer to:
 Ghaath (2000 film), an Indian Hindi-language crime drama film
 Ghaath (2023 film), an Indian Marathi-language thriller drama film